Christian Aflenzer (born 31 March 1972 in Munich) is a German-born Austrian football midfielder.

After initially playing for the youth teams of FC Bayern Munich and TSV 1860 München he begin his senior career in Austria in 1990 with SV Austria Salzburg. Since then he will play for a number of other Austrian and foreign clubs, in chronological order: SV Austria Klagenfurt, Mérida UD (Spain), FC Tirol Innsbruck, Admira Dornbirn, Dynamo Dresden (Germany), NK Istra (Croatia, Prva HNL), DSV Leoben, SV Mattersburg, LASK Linz, SV Schwechat, Wiener Sport-Club, SV Würmla, 1. Wiener Neustädter SC, SC Theresienfeld, SC Ortmann and SC Bad Sauerbrunn.

While playing with 1. Wiener Neustädter SC and SV Würmla he was simultaneously a player and a coach.

References

External sources

 Career at Tirol Innsbruck unofficial site

1972 births
Living people
Footballers from Munich
Austrian footballers
Austrian expatriate sportspeople in Spain
Association football midfielders
SV Mattersburg players
LASK players
Wiener Sport-Club players
SV Würmla players
Austrian Football Bundesliga players
Dynamo Dresden players
Mérida UD footballers
Expatriate footballers in Spain
NK Istra players
Croatian Football League players
Expatriate footballers in Croatia
1. Wiener Neustädter SC players